Alan Keith Scott (19 February 1907 – 3 April 1973) was an Australian rules footballer who played for the St Kilda Football Club in the Victorian Football League (VFL).

Family
The son of John Robert Scott (1881-1955), and Ellen Elizabeth Scott (1878-1924), née Ryan, Alan Keith Scott was born at East Melbourne, Victoria on 19 February 1907.

Football
While playing for the St Kilda Second XVIII, he was selected at centre half-back in a combined VFL Second's team that played against Geelong's First XVIII, during the two week suspension of the VFL season (due to the 1924 ANFC Carnival in Hobart), in Geelong on 9 August 1924.

Military service
He served in the Second AIF.

Death
He died at the Frankston Community Hospital, in Frankston, Victoria, on 3 April 1973.

Notes

References
 
 World War Two Nominal Roll: Corporal Alan Keith Scott (V205884), Department of Veterans' Affairs.
 B884, V205884: World War Two Service Record: Corporal Alan Keith Scott (V205884), National Archives of Australia.

External links 

1907 births
1973 deaths
Australian rules footballers from Melbourne
St Kilda Football Club players
Australian military personnel of World War II
People from East Melbourne
Military personnel from Melbourne